Eisbär is an EP by Deathline International, released on April 26, 2016, by COP International.

Track listing

Personnel
Adapted from the Eisbär liner notes.

Deathline International
 Christian Petke (as Count Zero) – vocals, recording

Additional performers
 Jan Bicker – remixer (1)
 Axel Ermes – remixer (1) 
 John Fryer – remixer (4)

Production and design
 Jeremy Goody – recording
 Steve Lam (as Slam) – recording

Release history

References

External links 
 Eisbär at Discogs (list of releases)
  Eisbär at Bandcamp
 Eisbär at iTunes

2016 EPs
Deathline International albums
COP International EPs